Tiegnou Valle Fatou Coulibaly (born 13 February 1987) is an Ivorian professional footballer who plays for Cypriot team Barcelona FA. She was part of the Ivorian squad for the 2015 FIFA Women's World Cup.

See also
List of Ivory Coast women's international footballers

References

External links
 
 Profile at FIF 

1987 births
Living people
Ivorian women's footballers
Ivory Coast women's international footballers
Place of birth missing (living people)
Women's association football defenders
2015 FIFA Women's World Cup players
Ivorian expatriate sportspeople in Cyprus
Ivorian expatriate footballers
Expatriate women's footballers in Cyprus
Barcelona FA players